Itzaea is a monotypic genus of flowering plants belonging to the family Convolvulaceae. The only species is Itzaea sericea. It was first published in the Field Musem of Natural History Botanical Series in 1944.

Its native range is Southern Mexico to Central America.

References

Convolvulaceae
Convolvulaceae genera
Monotypic Solanaceae genera